Spirophyton is the former name of an ichnogenus or trace fossil belonging to the Zoophycos.

References

Trace fossils
Paleozoic life of Yukon